Igor Bondžulić (born 5 October 1980) is a Serbian professional football manager and a former player who played as a goalkeeper.

Playing career
After starting out at Sloga Požega, Bondžulić joined Javor Ivanjica in the early 2000s. He made over 150 appearances for the club, before moving abroad and signing with Bulgarian side Lokomotiv Sofia in 2008.

While playing for Jagodina, Bondžulić helped them win the Serbian Cup in 2013. He also spent one season with Moroka Swallows in South Africa, before retiring from the game.

Managerial career
After hanging up his boots, Bondžulić served as an assistant and later caretaker manager at his former club Jagodina. He subsequently assisted Simo Krunić at Radnik Surdulica.

In June 2019, Bondžulić was appointed manager of newly promoted Serbian SuperLiga club Javor Ivanjica.

Managerial statistics

Honours
Javor Ivanjica
 Serbian First League: 2007–08
Jagodina
 Serbian Cup: 2012–13

References

External links
 
 
 

Association football goalkeepers
First Professional Football League (Bulgaria) players
Expatriate footballers in Bulgaria
Expatriate soccer players in South Africa
FC Lokomotiv 1929 Sofia players
First League of Serbia and Montenegro players
FK Jagodina managers
FK Jagodina players
FK Javor Ivanjica managers
FK Javor Ivanjica players
Moroka Swallows F.C. players
People from Požega, Serbia
Serbian expatriate footballers
Serbian expatriate sportspeople in Bulgaria
Serbian expatriate sportspeople in South Africa
Serbian First League players
Serbian football managers
Serbian footballers
Serbian SuperLiga managers
Serbian SuperLiga players
1980 births
Living people